Marcello Nizzola (17 December 1900 – 22 February 1947) was an Italian wrestler and Olympic medalist in Greco-Roman wrestling.

Nizzola competed at the 1932 Summer Olympics in Los Angeles where he received a silver medal in Greco-Roman wrestling, the bantamweight class. He also competed at the 1936 Summer Olympics.

References

External links
 

1900 births
1947 deaths
Olympic wrestlers of Italy
Wrestlers at the 1932 Summer Olympics
Wrestlers at the 1936 Summer Olympics
Italian male sport wrestlers
Olympic silver medalists for Italy
Olympic medalists in wrestling
Medalists at the 1932 Summer Olympics
20th-century Italian people